Gladkov is a rural locality (a settlement) in Basakinskoye Rural Settlement, Chernyshkovsky District, Volgograd Oblast, Russia. The population was 41 as of 2010. There are 2 streets.

Geography 
Gladkov is located 29 km southwest of Chernyshkovsky (the district's administrative centre) by road. Verkhnegnutov is the nearest rural locality.

References 

Rural localities in Chernyshkovsky District